Luigi Tosi ( Verona 15 July 1915 – Roma  12 March 1989) was an Italian actor. He appeared in more than seventy films from 1944 to 1965.

Filmography

References

External links 

1915 births
1989 deaths
Italian male film actors